Russian lacquer art developed from the art of icon painting, which came to an end with the collapse of Imperial Russia. The icon painters, who previously had been employed by supplying not only churches but people's homes, needed a way to make a living. Thus, the craft of making papier-mâché decorative boxes and panels developed, the items were lacquered and then hand painted by the artists, often with scenes from folk tales.

The four centers of Russian lacquer art
The village of Fedoskino (Федоскино), located not far from Moscow on the banks of the Ucha River, is the oldest of the four art centers of Russian lacquer miniature painting on papier-mâché, which has been practiced there since 1795. It stands apart both geographically, and in that that oil paints are used rather than egg tempera. While allowing the artist a free hand in impressionistic interpretation, the style of Fedoskino painting is largely realistic in composition and detail.

The other three Russian lacquer art centers are:
Palekh (Палех)
Kholuy (Kholui, Kholuj, Holui - Холуй)
Mstyora (Mstera - Мстёра)

The lacquer artists of Palekh, Kholuy and Mstyora continue to use the technique of painting in egg-based tempera overlaid with intricate gold leaf highlighting.''

All three are situated in the former Vladimir-Suzdal Principality, Ivanovo region of central Russia, and are deeply rooted in the 17th-19th century icon painting tradition, which lasted until the Russian Revolution of 1917, and is now being revived by young artists of the 21st century.

Gallery

See also
Palekh miniature
Khokhloma

External links
FEDOSKINO GALLERY 1, Russian Lacquer Miniatures by Isaev, KOZLOVA , Solodilov, Dubovikov, Makarov

References

Russian art
Papier-mâché
Russian culture
1795 establishments in the Russian Empire